Chyna Doll is the second studio album by American rapper Foxy Brown. It was released on January 26, 1999, by Ill Na Na Entertainment, Violator Records and Def Jam Recordings. After the commercial success of her debut album, Ill Na Na (1996), Brown began working on her second album. This time, she insisted on being the executive producer to have a creative control over the album. She collaborated with a number of producers, such as Kanye West, D-Dot, Irv Gotti, Lil Rob, Swizz Beatz and Tyrone Fyffe, among others.

Upon its release, Chyna Doll received mixed reviews from music critics. It debuted at the top of the Billboard 200, making it the first solo female rap album to debut at number one on the chart (landing a spot in the Guinness World Records of 1999 & 2000). The album was a commercial success. Selling 173,000 copies in its first week, it was later certified platinum by the Recording Industry Association of America (RIAA).

Background and recording 
Chyna Doll is the follow-up to Foxy Brown's 1996 platinum debut album Ill Na Na and was recorded in 1998. The album features guest appearances by DMX, Mýa, Total, Jay-Z, Beanie Sigel, Memphis Bleek, Eightball & MJG, Juvenile, Too Short, Pretty Boy (Gavin Marchand, also known as Young Gavin and Nino Brown), Mia X, Tha Dogg Pound, Gangsta Boo, and Noreaga. It also features a special appearance by Pam Grier, the actress who played the original Foxy Brown in the 1974 blaxploitation film. About this album, Brown said, "I wanted to captivate everyone. I wanted to get all the crowds. I wanted to get the Down South crowd, West Coast crowds, East Coast crowds, all the dopest MCs from each part of the world – and we just did our thing. It was dope, it was real hot. I'm very proud with this album."

Recording for her second album began in the summer of 1998. In September 1998, it was reported that Foxy Brown would remake Janet Jackson's classic "What Have You Done for Me Lately" for the upcoming album, as well as an update to N.W.A.'s "Real Niggaz Don't Die", calling it "Bitches with Attitude" featuring Southern female rappers Mia X and Gangsta Boo.

During the recording process of the album, alternative rock singer Fiona Apple agreed to make a guest appearance on the album after an invitation from Brown, but due to scheduling differences, the session could not be arranged in enough time to make the final cut. Foxy Brown had also asked Madonna to collaborate on the album, but due to unknown circumstances, nothing ever became of it.

Originally, the album was going to be called Femme Fatale and was originally going to be released on November 17, 1998, but Brown decided to delay the release of the album to give her enough time to make sure everything was the way she wanted it.

Critical reception 

Upon initial release, Chyna Doll received mixed to positive reviews. AllMusic's journalist Jose F. Promis rating the album 2.5 stars. He cites, "...for the most part, this album is full of unappealing, pornographic raps, lame beats, and pathetic gangster posturing. The sophomore slump is evident here...". Amazon journalist Oliver Wang states, "Chyna Doll just sounds like any number of New York-based rap albums, especially with its commercial formula of shuffling high hats, catchy hooks, and recycled funk loops. In the end, Brown's self-exploitive (sexually and racially) cover art is likely to offer more provocative statements than the album itself."

Commercial performance 
The album was released on January 26, 1999, and debuted on the Billboard 200 charts at No. 1, making it the second time Foxy Brown conquered the chart's top position. On March 24, 1999, Chyna Doll was certified platinum for shipments of over 1 million copies in the U.S.

Foxy Brown took the world by storm once again, this time she managed to peak in the Top 50 of every country with her sophomore album. Chyna Doll charted for 20 Weeks in the United States, 15 Weeks in Canada, 9 Weeks in Germany, 7 Weeks in Switzerland, 5 Weeks in The Netherlands, 4 Weeks in the United Kingdom, and 3 Weeks in France.

Promotion 
Three singles were released to promote the album. “Hot Spot” was the album's lead single. It peaked at number 91 on the Billboard Hot 100.

The second single was “I Can’t” featuring Total. The single failed to chart on the Billboard Hot 100.

The third and final single was “J.O.B.” featuring R&B singer, Mya. The song was given a vinyl single release and also failed to chart. An alternate version featuring British girl group Honeyz was also released, but only in France.

In March 1999, it was announced that Foxy Brown would tour with R. Kelly on the "Get Up on a Room" tour featuring Busta Rhymes, Nas, Deborah Cox, and Kelly Price. After cancelling several dates due to slow ticket sales, a fatal stabbing in Miami, and Rhymes pulling out of the tour, Brown left the tour and pursued her own North American Chyna Doll Tour that began in August 1999 and stopped at 22 cities in America.

Track listing 

Unreleased songs
 Star Wars (featuring Busta Rhymes) An unreleased song from the Chyna Doll sessions that did not make the final release of the album. The song has remained unreleased.
 Unknown Title (featuring R. Kelly) MTV reported that Foxy Brown collaborated with R. Kelly for Chyna Doll. Although it is not confirmed, the song could have possibly been "Dollar Bill", which appeared on R. Kelly's "R." album.
 Lately A remake of Janet Jackson's "What Have You Done for Me Lately". The song featured a sample of Janet Jackson's voice and she did not make an official appearance on the song, as was reported. The song did not make the final version of the album.
 Fuck ‘Em (featuring N.O.R.E.) Released prior to the album on mixtape circuits from the Chyna Doll sessions that did not make the final release of the album.
 Maria (featuring Pretty Boy) Released prior to the album on various mixtape sessions. Rumoured to have been on the album however ultimately didn’t make the final release.
 Rolls Royce (Cream Drop) Also known as "S.O.F.T.". Although the song did not appear on the album, it was released through the mixtape circuits in New York City as a buzz single for the album.

Samples
 "Chyna White" contains a sample of "Walk on By" by Isaac Hayes
 "J.O.B." contains a sample of "Ain't Nothin' Goin' On But the Rent" by Gwen Guthrie
 "I Can't" contains a sample of "Everything She Wants" by Wham!
 "Bonnie & Clyde Part II" contains a sample of "Secret Rendezvous" by Rene & Angela
 "Tramp" contains a sample of "The Champ" by The Mohawks

Charts

Weekly charts

Year-end charts

Certifications

See also
 Number-one albums of 1999 (U.S.)
 List of number-one R&B albums of 1999 (U.S.)

References

External links 
 Foxy Brown's Official MySpace Page
 

1999 albums
Albums produced by Irv Gotti
Albums produced by Kanye West
Albums produced by Swizz Beatz
Albums recorded at Electric Lady Studios
Def Jam Recordings albums
Foxy Brown (rapper) albums